The 1963 North Dakota State Bison football team was an American football team that represented North Dakota Agricultural College (now known as North Dakota State University) in the North Central Conference (NCC) during the 1963 NCAA College Division football season.  In its first season under head coach Darrell Mudra, the team compiled a 3–5 record (3–3 against NCC opponents) and finished in fourth place out of seven teams in the NCC. The team played its home games at Dacotah Field in Fargo, North Dakota.

Schedule

References

North Dakota State
North Dakota State Bison football seasons
North Dakota State Bison football